The Tampa Tarpons are a Minor League Baseball team of the Florida State League and the Single-A affiliate of the New York Yankees. They are located in Tampa, Florida. The Tarpons play their home games at George M. Steinbrenner Field, which is also the spring training home of the New York Yankees and incorporates design elements from old Yankee Stadium in the Bronx, including identical field dimensions. They competed at the Class A-Advanced level from 1994 to 2020 before being reclassified Low Single-A in 2021. Since their inception, the club has won five league championships, in 1994, 2001, 2004, 2009, and 2010.

The club was established in 1994 as the Tampa Yankees and played for 24 seasons under that name. Before the 2018 season, the team was rebranded as the "Tampa Tarpons", reviving a name that had been used by an earlier franchise in the FSL for over 30 years.

History

Tampa has a long history of amateur and organized baseball, with the first spring training held in the city in 1913 and the Tampa Smokers founded as charter members of the FSL in 1919. In anticipation of a potential Major League Baseball expansion team, the original Tampa Tarpons of the FSL relocated in 1988 and Al Lopez Field was demolished soon thereafter. However, the expected franchise was eventually awarded to nearby St. Petersburg, leaving Tampa without a professional baseball team or venue.

In 1994, the New York Yankees established a new Class A-Advanced FSL team and placed them in Tampa, replacing their previous Class-A Advanced affiliate, the Prince William Cannons. After operating as the Tampa Yankees for 24 seasons, the club was rebranded as the Tarpons in 2018, reviving the name of Tampa's longest-lasting minor league ballclub. For the 2021 season, the FSL was reconfigured as a Low Single-A circuit and the Florida State League name was retired, with the circuit being called the Low-A Southeast. In 2022, the Low-A Southeast became known as the Florida State League, the name historically used by the regional circuit prior to the 2021 reorganization, and was reclassified as a Single-A circuit.

On January 9, 2022, the Yankees announced that Rachel Balkovec has been hired to manage the Tarpons.  She is the first woman to manage a minor league team affiliated with Major League Baseball.

Notable major league players to once play for the Tampa Yankees / Tarpons include Aaron Judge, Derek Jeter, Rubén Rivera, Mariano Rivera, David Robertson, Joba Chamberlain, Ian Kennedy, Phil Hughes, Ramiro Mendoza, Tim Raines, Eric Milton, and Luis Sojo.

Ballpark

As part of a deal with the city of Tampa, the Tampa Sports Authority agreed to publicly finance a new ballpark for the New York Yankees to use during spring training and the Tampa Yankees to use during the summer. Legends Field has the same dimensions as Yankee Stadium and includes some design elements of the previous ballpark in the Bronx. The Tampa Yankees played their first two seasons (1994 and 1995) at Red McEwen Field on the campus of the University of South Florida while their permanent home was under construction. In 1996, the New York Yankees held spring training at newly completed Legends Field, moving from their long-time spring facilities at Fort Lauderdale, and the Tampa Yankees played at the new ballpark that summer. In 2008, Legends Field was renamed in honor of ailing long-time Yankees owner George Steinbrenner, who lived in Tampa.

Steinbrenner Field has a baseball capacity of about 11,000 and is located across Dale Mabry Highway from the Tampa Bay Buccaneers' home of Raymond James Stadium. The facility has an adjacent parking lot that is sufficient for most minor league crowds, and a pedestrian bridge allows for spring training attendees to park at the football stadium's much larger parking area and safely cross the busy highway to Steinbrenner Field.

Playoffs
2017: Lost to Dunedin 2–1 in semifinals.
2016: Lost to Bradenton 3–1 in the FSL finals.
2010: Defeated Dunedin 2–0 in semifinals; defeated Charlotte 3–1 to win championship.
2009: Defeated Brevard County 2–0 in semifinals; defeated Charlotte 3–2 to win championship.
2004: Defeated Dunedin 2–0 in semifinals; declared co-champions with Daytona.
2002: Lost to Charlotte 2–0 in semifinals.
2001: Defeated Charlotte 2–0 in semifinals; declared co-champions with Brevard County.
1998: Defeated Charlotte 2–0 in semifinals; lost to St. Lucie 3–2 in finals.
1996: Lost to Clearwater 2–0 in semifinals.
1995: Lost to Fort Myers 2–1 in semifinals.
1994: Defeated Sarasota 2–1 in semifinals; defeated Brevard County 3–1 to win championship.

Roster

Notable people
Note: Years indicate service time with the Tampa Yankees / Tarpons, either as a minor leaguer or on an injury rehabilitation assignment

Hall of Fame alumni

Tim Raines (1996-1997) Inducted, 2017
 Mariano Rivera (1994) 13 x MLB All-Star; 1999 World Series Most Valuable Player; All-Time MLB Saves Leader, Inducted 2019 With 100% of votes
Derek Jeter (1994, 2000) 14 x MLB All-Star; 1996 AL Rookie of the Year; 2000 World Series Most Valuable Player, Inducted 2020
Notable alumni

 John Axford (2007) 2011 NL Saves Leader
 Andrew Bailey (2015) 2 x MLB All-Star; 2009 AL Rookie of the Year
 Carlos Beltrán (2015) 9 x MLB All-Star; 1999 AL Rookie of the Year
 Dellin Betances (2010) 4 x MLB All-Star
 Melky Cabrera (2004) MLB All-Star
 Robinson Cano (2003) 8 x MLB All-Star
 Francisco Cervelli (2007-2008, 2011, 2014)
 Joba Chamberlain (2007, 2012)
 Tyler Clippard (2005) 2 x MLB All-Star
 Mike DeJean (1994)
 Jacoby Ellsbury (2015) MLB All-Star
 Didi Gregorius (2017, 2019)
 Matt Holliday (2017) 7 x MLB All-Star; 2007 NLCS Most Valuable Player
 Phil Hughes (2005-2006) MLB All-Star
 Nick Johnson (1998)
 Aaron Judge (2014) 2 x MLB All-Star; 2017 AL Rookie of the Year
 Ian Kennedy (2007-2008) 2011 NL Wins Leader
 Ted Lilly (2000) 2 x MLB All-Star
 Adam Lind (2018)
 Mike Lowell (1996) 4 x MLB All-Star; 2007 World Series Most Valuable Player
 Lee Mazzilli (1997-1998, MGR) MLB All-Star
 Eric Milton (1997) MLB All-Star
 Dioner Navarro (2002) MLB All-Star
 Ivan Nova (2008, 2015)
 Carl Pavano (2005-2006) MLB All-Star
 Mark Prior (2011) MLB All-Star
 Juan Rivera (1999-2000, 2005)
 David Robertson (2007) MLB All-Star
 Brendan Ryan (2014-2015)
 CC Sabathia (2014, 2019) 6 x MLB All-Star; 2007 AL Cy Young
 Gary Sanchez (2012-2013) 2 x MLB All-Star
 Luis Severino (2014, 2016, 2021) 2 x MLB All-Star
 Luis Sojo (2006-2008, 2009, 2011–2013, MGR)
 Giancarlo Stanton (2019) 4 x MLB All-Star; 2017 NL Most Valuable Player
 Marcus Thames (1999)
 Gleyber Torres (2016, 2018) 2 x MLB All-Star
 Troy Tulowitzki (2019) 5 x MLB All-Star

References

External links

 Official website

Sports teams in Tampa, Florida
Professional baseball teams in Florida
Baseball teams established in 1994
New York Yankees minor league affiliates
1994 establishments in Florida
Florida State League teams